The following outline is provided as an overview of and topical guide to the U.S. state of North Dakota:

North Dakota – 39th state of the United States, having been admitted to the union on November 2, 1889.  The state capital is Bismarck, and the largest city is Fargo. North Dakota is the 19th most extensive but the 3rd least populous and the 4th least densely populated of the 50 United States.

General reference

 Names
 Common name: North Dakota
 Pronunciation: 
 Official name: State of North Dakota
 Abbreviations and name codes
 Postal symbol:  ND
 ISO 3166-2 code:  US-ND
 Internet second-level domain:  .nd.us
 Nicknames
 Flickertail State
 Peace Garden State (currently used on license plates)
 Rough Rider State
 Sioux State
 Adjectivals: North Dakota, North Dakotan
 Demonym: North Dakotan

Geography of North Dakota

Geography of North Dakota
 North Dakota is: a U.S. state, a federal state of the United States of America
 Location
 Northern hemisphere
 Western hemisphere
 Americas
 North America
 Anglo America
 Northern America
 United States of America
 Contiguous United States
 Canada–US border
 Central United States
 West North Central States
 The Dakotas
 Midwestern United States
 Great plains
 Population of North Dakota: 672,591  (2010 U.S. Census)
 Area of North Dakota:
 Atlas of North Dakota

Places in North Dakota
 List of cemeteries in North Dakota
 Historic places in North Dakota
 National Historic Landmarks in North Dakota
 National Register of Historic Places listings in North Dakota
 Bridges on the National Register of Historic Places in North Dakota
 National Natural Landmarks in North Dakota
 National parks in North Dakota
 State parks in North Dakota

Environment of North Dakota

 Climate of North Dakota
 Superfund sites in North Dakota
 Wildlife of North Dakota
 Fauna of North Dakota
 Birds of North Dakota

Natural geographic features of North Dakota

 Rivers of North Dakota

Regions of North Dakota

Administrative divisions of North Dakota

 The 53 counties of the state of North Dakota
 Municipalities in North Dakota
 Cities in North Dakota
 State capital of North Dakota: Bismarck
 Largest city in North Dakota: Fargo
 City nicknames in North Dakota
 List of townships in North Dakota

Demography of North Dakota

Demographics of North Dakota

Government and politics of North Dakota

Politics of North Dakota
 Form of government: U.S. state government
 United States congressional delegations from North Dakota
 North Dakota State Capitol
 Elections in North Dakota
 Electoral reform in North Dakota
 Political party strength in North Dakota
 North Dakota Association of Counties

Branches of the government of North Dakota

Government of North Dakota

Executive branch of the government of North Dakota
 Governor of North Dakota
 Lieutenant Governor of North Dakota
 Secretary of State of North Dakota
 State Treasurer of North Dakota
 State departments
 North Dakota Department of Transportation

Legislative branch of the government of North Dakota

 North Dakota Legislative Assembly (bicameral)
 Upper house: North Dakota Senate
 Lower house: North Dakota House of Representatives

Judicial branch of the government of North Dakota

Courts of North Dakota
 Supreme Court of North Dakota

Law and order in North Dakota
Law of North Dakota
 Cannabis in North Dakota
 Capital punishment in North Dakota – See Capital punishment in the United States
 Constitution of North Dakota
 Crime in North Dakota
 Gun laws in North Dakota
 Law enforcement in North Dakota
 Law enforcement agencies in North Dakota

Military in North Dakota

 North Dakota Air National Guard
 North Dakota Army National Guard

History of North Dakota

History of North Dakota
Founding dates of North Dakota incorporated cities

History of North Dakota, by period 

Indigenous peoples
English territory of Rupert's Land, 1670–1707
French colony of Louisiane, 1699–1764
Treaty of Fontainebleau of 1762
British territory of Rupert's Land, (1707–1818)-1870
Spanish (though predominantly Francophone) district of Alta Luisiana, 1764–1803
Third Treaty of San Ildefonso of 1800
French district of Haute-Louisiane, 1803
Louisiana Purchase of 1803
Unorganized U.S. territory created by the Louisiana Purchase, 1803–1804
Lewis and Clark Expedition, 1804–1806
District of Louisiana, 1804–1805
Territory of Louisiana, 1805–1812
Territory of Missouri, 1812–1821
War of 1812, June 18, 1812 – March 23, 1815
Treaty of Ghent, December 24, 1814
Anglo-American Convention of 1818
Unorganized Territory, 1821–1854
Mexican–American War, April 25, 1846 – February 2, 1848
Treaty of Fort Laramie of 1851
Territory of Michigan east of Missouri River and White Earth River, 1805-(1834–1836)-1837
Territory of Wisconsin east of Missouri River and White Earth River, (1836–1838)-1848
Territory of Iowa east of Missouri River and White Earth River, 1838–1846
Territory of Minnesota east of Missouri River and White Earth River, 1849–1858
Territory of Nebraska west of Missouri River or White Earth River, (1854–1861)-1867
Territory of Dakota, 1861–1889
American Civil War, April 12, 1861 – May 13, 1865
Dakota in the American Civil War, 1861–1865
State of North Dakota becomes 39th state admitted to the United States of America on November 2, 1889
Theodore Roosevelt National Park designated on November 10, 1978

History of North Dakota, by region

By county
 History of Cass County
 History of Emmons County
 History of Stark County

By city

 History of Bismarck, North Dakota
 History of Grand Forks, North Dakota

History of North Dakota, by subject 
 Political history of North Dakota

Culture of North Dakota

Culture of North Dakota
 Cuisine of North Dakota
 LGBT history in North Dakota
 Museums in North Dakota
 Religion in North Dakota
 Episcopal Diocese of North Dakota
 Scouting in North Dakota
 State symbols of North Dakota
 Flag of the state of North Dakota
 Great Seal of the State of North Dakota

The arts in North Dakota
 Music of North Dakota

Economy and infrastructure of North Dakota

Economy of North Dakota
 Agriculture in North Dakota
 Communications in North Dakota
 Newspapers in North Dakota
 Radio stations in North Dakota
 Television stations in North Dakota
 Energy in North Dakota
 Power stations in North Dakota
 Solar power in North Dakota
 Wind power in North Dakota
 Health care in North Dakota
 Hospitals in North Dakota
 Mining in North Dakota
 Coal in North Dakota
 Petroleum in North Dakota
 Transportation in North Dakota
 Airports in North Dakota

Education in North Dakota

Education in North Dakota
 Schools in North Dakota
 School districts in North Dakota
 High schools in North Dakota
 Colleges and universities in North Dakota
 University of North Dakota
 North Dakota State University

See also

Topic overview:
North Dakota

Index of North Dakota-related articles

References

External links

North Dakota
North Dakota